River Hamble Country Park is a   Local Nature Reserve which runs along the west bank of the River Hamble between the villages of Botley and Bursledon  in Hampshire. It is owned by Hampshire County Council and managed by  Hampshire Countryside Service. It is part of Solent and Southampton Water Ramsar site and  Special Protection Area, and of Solent Maritime Special Area of Conservation. Part of it is in Upper Hamble Estuary and Woods, which is a  Site of Special Scientific Interest.

History

The park first opened in 1979 as Upper Hamble Country Park and in 1984 the Manor Farm museum was opened to the north of the site as a Wartime museum. The museum site was once at the heart of the village of Botley. The ancient duckpond in Manor Farm and the neighbouring St Bartholomew's Church are mentioned in the Domesday book. There is evidence of a Roman road running through the site, which would have been the route between the Roman settlements of Clausentum (Bitterne Manor) and Portus Adurni (Portchester).

This park is on the site of the former Royal Navy shore establishment named HMS Cricket.

Once decommissioned in 1946, the buildings that were left behind by the Royal Navy were used to house citizens of Southampton who were displaced by bombing during World War II. The site was then known as "The Cricket Camp", until 1952 when it was no longer required for that purpose.

Most of the wartime buildings have been demolished, but River Hamble Country Park retains a much smaller "Cricket Camp" which is used by Scouts.

Facilities

Outside of Manor Farm, which is located within the country park on its North West boundary, the country park's facilities are located around two main fields surrounded by wooded copses. The northern 'Toplands' field contains eight barbecue pitches and has a dog training field nearby for locals. The southern 'Barnfield' site contains a kiosk selling refreshments and a play area and is the start of a number of way-marked walks around the park.

In 2019 it was reported that Hampshire County Council would be investing £800,000 into the Country Park through the construction of a new visitor centre, replacement of play equipment and the improvement of wayfinding and walking routes across the site.

The western extremity of the site, along the access road, includes the location of Cricket Camp Scout Activity Centre, used by Itchen South Scouts and the Queen Elizabeth II Silver Jubilee Activities Centre.

Manor Farm

Within the country park at the North East of the park lies Manor Farm, a historic farm attraction with its own opening hours and pricing policy. It opened in 1984 as the Manor Farm museum and has since developed into a family-focused visitor attraction within the setting of the historic village run by Hampshire County Council.

The site includes historic buildings that link to the heritage of the site and the original museum including a forge, wheelwrights, farmhouse and Victorian schoolhouse. The ancient duckpond and the neighbouring St Bartholomew's Church also form part of the location.

Popular activities on offer at the farm include feeding, walking and seeing the animals and a large galvanised steel roundhouse was erected on the site in 2019 in order to house the animals while visitors could watch form the included viewing gallery. Other on-site facilities include a visitor centre and gift shop located in the 18th century threshing barn, a large indoor children's play area - the Playbarn, a cafe for visitors as well as amenities such as toilets and an education centre for visiting school groups.
 
Manor Farm was the location for the historical documentary TV series Wartime Farm, broadcast by the BBC in 2012.

The Manor Farm at this site is not to be confused with the Manor Farm, near Alton, where Alan Titchmarsh films his Love Your Weekend television show.

See also
River Hamble
Royal Victoria Country Park

References

External links
 River Hamble Country Park - official site
 Manor Farm - official site
 Local Heritage Initiative
 QE2 activity centre (click on "useful info" for more on HMS Cricket)

Country parks in Hampshire
Museums in Hampshire
Living museums in England
Farm museums in England
Local Nature Reserves in Hampshire